Jillian Wendy Mortimer (née Sowerby; born 20 March 1965) is a British Conservative Party politician serving as Member of Parliament (MP) for Hartlepool since 2021.

Personal life
Mortimer was born Jillian Wendy Sowerby on 20 March 1965 in Leeds. Her father was a builder and her mother was a greengrocer. She attended Parklands Girls High School and later read law at Teesside University as a mature student at the age of 50, studying alongside two of her three children. One of her grandmothers grew up in Hartlepool.

Before entering the House of Commons, Mortimer was a farmer in Knayton, North Yorkshire, hand-rearing Dexter cows and selling the beef and lamb from the gate of the farm and also training to become a barrister. Today the farm operates as a upmarket B&B with planning permission granted for yurts and shepherd's huts to be added to the site. She announced her intention to buy a property in the Hartlepool constituency following her election, however is yet to do so.

Political career
Mortimer served as a councillor for Raskelf & White Horse Ward on Hambleton District Council between May 2019 and October 2021. She contested Leeds East at the 2019 general election.

Member of Parliament
Mortimer was confirmed as the prospective parliamentary candidate for Hartlepool on 26 March 2021, in advance of the subsequent by-election on 6 May. The by-election was announced following the resignation of Mike Hill, the incumbent Labour MP. She described her priorities for Hartlepool as being: "Recovering from the pandemic, regenerating our high streets and local communities, unlocking the opportunities of Brexit to help create good quality sustainable jobs, helping businesses deliver more apprenticeships and recruiting more police officers."

During the campaign, the deputy leader of the Labour Party, Angela Rayner, accused Mortimer of tax avoidance when previously living with her first husband, Marcus Killick, and their family in the Cayman Islands. The co-chairman of the Conservative Party, Amanda Milling, tweeted that Rayner had made "an eye-popping error" in having "tried to slur" Mortimer as Killick had been working as for the Cayman Islands Monetary Authority, the primary financial services regulator for the British Overseas Territory. Milling stated Mortimer and her ex-husband "did not gain any tax advantage from living in the Cayman Islands, nor did she advise any others on this".

Mortimer won the by-election with a majority of 6,940 votes and a swing from Labour of 16.0%, becoming the first Conservative and woman to represent the constituency in Parliament since its creation in 1974. John Kerans had been the last Conservative MP to represent the town and The Hartlepools between 1959 and 1964.

Mortimer made her maiden speech in the House of Commons on 21 September 2021.

In June 2022, during the 2022 vote of confidence in the Conservative Party leadership of Boris Johnson, Mortimer expressed her support for the prime minister.

In September 2022, Mortimer resigned as a parliamentary private secretary after two weeks in the role to focus on her constituency.

Mortimer sent a letter of no confidence in the leadership of Liz Truss on 20 October 2022.

References

External links

1965 births
Living people
People from Hambleton District
Politicians from Leeds
Alumni of Teesside University
UK MPs 2019–present
Conservative Party (UK) MPs for English constituencies
Female members of the Parliament of the United Kingdom for English constituencies
Conservative Party (UK) councillors
Councillors in North Yorkshire
21st-century British women politicians
21st-century English women politicians
Women councillors in England